Tachiniscidia is a genus of Tephritid or fruit flies in the family Tephritidae. Several species appear like wasps.

References

Tachiniscinae
Tephritidae genera